Impetuous may refer to:

 Impetuous Theater Group, a theatre company
 USS Impetuous (PYc-46), a United States Navy patrol boat